I Know What You Did Last Summer is an American teen horror television series based on the 1973 novel of the same name by Lois Duncan. It was adapted for Amazon Prime Video by Sara Goodman and is produced by Amazon Studios and Sony Pictures Television Studios, in association with Original Film, Mandalay Television and Atomic Monster Productions. Part of the I Know What You Did Last Summer franchise, the series is a modern take on the original novel and follows a group of friends stalked by a brutal killer one year after covering up a car accident in which they killed someone. It features a cast led by Madison Iseman, Brianne Tju, Ezekiel Goodman, Ashley Moore, and Sebastian Amoruso, and also stars Bill Heck, Fiona Rene, Cassie Beck, and Brooke Bloom.

Amazon Studios announced the series's development in 2019, with Neal H. Moritz and James Wan serving as executive producers. It was given a straight-to-series order in October 2020. Filming took place in Oahu and began in January 2021.  The first four episodes premiered on Amazon Prime Video on October 15, 2021, to mixed reviews, with the remaining episodes debuting on a weekly basis. In January 2022, the series was canceled after one season.

Cast and characters

Main

 Madison Iseman as Allison, Lennon's "good, weird, boring" twin sister with whom she has a rivalry. She is part of what happened last summer.
 Iseman also portrays Lennon, Allison's "partying, popular and sexual" twin sister
 Bill Heck as Bruce, Allison and Lennon's father, who hides a secret from them. He owns Ohana Restaurant and Lodging and knows what happened last summer.
 Brianne Tju as Margot, the millionaire and best friend of Johnny and Lennon, although she is attracted to her. She is part of what happened last summer.
 Ezekiel Goodman as Dylan, Allison's love interest and Riley's best friend. He is part of what happened last summer. 
 Ashley Moore as Riley, Lennon's friend and drug dealer and Dylan's best friend. She is part of what happened last summer.
 Sebastian Amoruso as Johnny, Margot's gay best friend who has a special connection with Allison. He is part of what happened last summer.
 Fiona Rene as Lyla, a police officer who carries out the investigation of the murders and is connected to Bruce
 Cassie Beck as Courtney, Riley's mother, a somewhat violent woman who works at Ohana Restaurant and Lodging
 Brooke Bloom as Clara, a mysterious woman who seems to have a connection with the twins' mother. She knows what happened last summer.

Recurring

 Sonya Balmores as Mei, Margot's mother who encourages her to be an influencer
 Danielle Delaunay as Hannah, Dylan's hippie-ish mother
 Chrissie Fit as Kelly, Eric's ex-wife
 Victoria Schmidt as Ulani Kalama, a police officer who works with Lyla

In addition, Spencer Sutherland co-stars as Dale, a young man from the village who saw Lennon's group the night of the event.

Episodes

Production
On July 26, 2019, it was announced that Amazon Studios would develop a television series based on the 1973 novel I Know What You Did Last Summer by Lois Duncan, with Neal H. Moritz and Pavun Shetty of Original Film serving as executive producers and Shay Hatten writing the plot. On October 14, 2020, Amazon gave the project a series order, and it was announced that Sara Goodman had replaced Hatten as series writer. It was also announced that Goodman and Hatten would serve as executive producers on the series, alongside Erik Feig of Original Film and Rob Hackett, Michael Clear, and James Wan of Atomic Monster. On December 9, 2020, Craig William Macneill was announced as the director of the pilot as well as an executive producer. On January 11, 2021, Madison Iseman, Brianne Tju, Ezekiel Goodman, Ashley Moore, Sebastian Amoruso, Fiona Rene, Cassie Beck, Brooke Bloom, and Bill Heck were cast in starring roles. Later than month, Sonya Balmores was cast in a recurring role. In the following two months, Spencer Sutherland and Chrissie Fit also joined the cast in a recurring capacity. The series began filming on January 25, 2021, on Oahu.

A soundtrack album for I Know What You Did Last Summer was released on October 15, 2021, by Madison Gate Records, featuring original music by composers Drum & Lace and Ian Hultquist. The series premiered on Amazon Prime Video on the same date, with the first four episodes available immediately and the rest subsequently debuting on a weekly basis. On January 7, 2022, Amazon Prime Video canceled the series after one season.

Reception

The review aggregator website Rotten Tomatoes reports a 41% approval rating with an average rating of 5.3/10, based on 44 critic reviews. The website's critics consensus reads, "A bloodless slasher that fails to congeal, I Know What You Did Last Summers killer cast can't make up for the show's many plot holes and unsatisfying twists." Metacritic, which uses a weighted average, assigned a score of 45 out of 100 based on 14 critics, indicating "mixed or average reviews".

Meagan Navarro, writing for Bloody Disgusting, gave the series three out of five stars. Navarro wrote, "Fantastic deaths and a gripping murder mystery pull you in, even when its mostly unlikeable leads tend to polarize", adding, "The more the series progresses, the murkier things get. It succeeds wholly in ensuring an unpredictable mystery that continues to surprise. When you think you've nailed a reveal, the series makes a shocking left turn", and concluded writing that "They may not engender themselves well to the viewer, but the slow trickle truth of who they are and their many secrets makes for a propulsive watch all the same."

Daniel Fienberg, writing for The Hollywood Reporter, said that, unlike the films, the then-teenagers are users of Instagram, and that "it is only somewhat about Instagram, on a purely practical level, but it takes the myopia exhibited in previous versions of the story to an extreme". He added that while a "new take absolutely has an angle all its own, and a justification for retelling this story", it is "mediocre", and concluded saying there is something "amusingly subversive" about the "kills" that define the genre.

Aedan Juvet of Screen Rant praised the adaptation and its use of "next-gen scream queen" Tju, writing that the actor "bring laughs, screams, and sheer perfection to her role as the series' all-important character".

References

External links
 

I Know What You Did Last Summer (franchise)
2021 American television series debuts
2021 American television series endings
2020s American teen drama television series
2020s American horror television series
2020s American mystery television series
2020s American LGBT-related drama television series
American horror fiction television series
American thriller television series
 Bisexuality-related television series
Horror drama television series
English-language television shows
Amazon Prime Video original programming
Television series by Amazon Studios
Television series by Sony Pictures Television
Television shows based on American novels
Serial killers in television
Murder in television
Television shows about death
Television series about teenagers
Television series about sisters
Television series about twins
Identity theft in popular culture
Works about stalking
Television shows filmed in Hawaii
Television shows set in Hawaii